Mawarid Finance is a private joint stock company in Dubai, United Arab Emirates, providing Shari'a-compliant financial services. It was founded in 2006 with a paid-up capital of AED 1 billion. All of its products are based on Islamic financial principles such as Ijarah, Istisnaa, Murabaha, Mudharaba, Musharaka, Kafalah and Wakala and its practices are governed by a full Sharia board.

It is the only finance company in the UAE that is completely independent. In an effort to give itself operational freedom, its shares are distributed across more than 350 shareholders, with companies or organisations owning not more than 5% each of the capital and no individual shareholder's stake exceeding 2.5%

The company markets itself with the tagline Falak Tayyeb (in Arabic) which in English roughly translates as 'Consider it done'. This is intended to show its commitment to fast and personalized service.

Mawarid's primary goal has been to support and participate in the development of the UAE economy by:
 Supporting small and medium businesses (SMEs) which comprise 85% of the companies registered in the UAE. To this end, it operates the Falak Tayyeb for SMEs campaign.
 Encouraging UAE Nationals to participate in the nation's development through a policy of Emiratisation. Emiratis comprise more than 30% of Mawarid's workforce and their percentage rises to more than 70% in executive positions. This is in contrast to the 0.34% average in UAE's private sector.

Campaigns

 A product called eMurabaha was launched in 2008 which allows a customer to request, follow up and manage funding online through a fund management system following the Islamic mode of Murabaha. In 2011, this product won the 'Idea of the Year' award at the Ideas.Arabia 6th International Conference.
 Mawarid partners with Alaswaq Alarabiya of Al Arabiya News Channel on the first e-portal of its kind, Myislamicfinance.com, dedicated to providing information and serving as a directory of Islamic finance products and services.
 Apart from its Falak Tayyeb campaign which is the only local phrase to be used as a brand tagline in the region, it uses the Origami art form in its product branding. This serves "as a visual metaphor for not only the precision and intricate care that the company has taken with its customised products but also the blank page that Mawarid Finance shares with its customers before building their future".

Significant achievements
Mawarid Finance has had the following achievements:

 Gained ISO 9001 certification in 2008.
 Won the Bizz Arab Business Excellence Award by the World Confederation of Businesses in 2008.
 Won a Dubai Human Development Award in 2008.
 Won 'Human Resources Development'- Sharjah award in 2008 for achieving the highest rate of Emiratisation compared to thirteen other working financial corporations in the market.
 Awarded Best Home Finance Provider at the 2008 CPI Financial awards organised by the Islamic Business and Finance Magazine from CPI Financial.
 Voted a 'Superbrand' in 2009 and 2010 by UAE Superbrands Council. Mawarid stayed in the list in 2010 even as several luxury brands and banks were dropped from the top brand lists due to the global economic crisis.
 Only private company to be awarded the Emirates Social Award 2010 by the Ministry of Social Affairs, UAE.
 Won Dubai Quality Appreciation Award 2010 in the Finance category by the Department of Economic Development, Dubai.
 Awarded Idea of the Year 2010 by the Dubai Quality Group at the Ideas.Arabia 5th International Conference for the MAN Model designed by Mawarid CEO, Mohamed Ali Musabbeh Al Neaimi. The MAN Model is an integrated system for decision making, risk management and pricing strategy for financial institutions.
 Gold category winner of Idea of the Year 2011 for eMurhabaha at the Ideas.Arabia 6th International Conference organized by the Dubai Quality Group.

Company history

2007

 Moved outside UAE by becoming one among the establishing investors who set up First Investment Bank, an Islamic investment company in Bahrain.
 Authorized by UAE's Ministry of Finance and Industry to provide automatic registration of bank guarantees issued in favour of the Ministry of Labor through the e-Dirham system.
 Platinum sponsor of the 9th Middle East International Motor Show, offering the longest auto loan tenure of 72 months in the UAE.  Research conducted by Mawarid during the Auto Show showed that a "BMW is the dream car in the UAE while Emiratis' fantasy is a Bentley".
 Teamed with ETA Star to provide Ijara financing to customers buying units in ETA's Centrium project. In Ijara, the title is transferred to the buyer upon contract fulfillment.

2008

Mawarid

 Announced the launch of its services for small and medium enterprises (SMEs) while sponsoring the "2nd Young Businessmen Forum" in Ras Al Khaimah. These services include goods finance, car finance, machinery finance, office purchasing finance, investments, fixed deposits, bank guarantees, labour guarantees and stock buying finance. Along with the Mohammed Bin Rashid Establishment for Young Business Leaders, it began a campaign to support youth enterprise. The Falak Tayyeb for SMEs campaign, with an investment of AED 600 million from Mawarid in 2008, would enable both parties to share databases with the goal of providing innovate Islamic financial services to this crucial sector. Subsequently, Mawarid has organized many discussion forums with both the government and private sectors (including entering into an MoU with the Ajman Businesswomen Council in 2009) and joined the Arab Union for Small Enterprises. This campaign has received support and appreciation in the region.
 Acquired a 1% stake in Egypt Telecommunication Company (Etisalat Misr).
 Appointed as account trustee for all property development Guarantee Accounts approved by the Dubai Land Department. Mawarid was chosen because of its expertise in the area and its Shari'a compliance.
 Partnered with real estate developers, Cayan to provide Islamic finance for buyers in Cayan projects. The latter is credited with projects like the Infinity Tower, a luxury 'twisting tower' with panoramic views of the Arabian ocean.
 Officially categorized as a bank operating in the UAE when it was authorized to issue certificates of deposit by the Dubai Department of Economic Development.
 Entered into an MoU with the UAE Ministry of Health to provide the Health Fund both financial and logistic services on an annual basis.

Mawarid subsidiary

 Mawarid acquired Al Jazeera Financial Services, a private equity company specializing in financial intermediation and investment in Shari'a-compliant stocks on both ADX and DFM.
 Dar Al Takaful, a joint stock Islamic insurance company of which Mawarid is the main founder, went public in July 2008.

2009

 Received further support in its Falak Tayyeb for SMEs campaign when it signed MoUs with Talal Abu-Ghazaleh International and Ruwad establishment.
 Chosen by the Arab Science and Technology Foundation (ASTF) and the Arab Union of Small Enterprises (AUSE) to organize the First Arab Industrial Enterprises Competition for SMEs. The competition, with an award allocation of $850,000, "aims to encourage and inspire the Arab youth to establish new industrial enterprises".
 Announced a tie-up with the UAE government to set up a central body to oversee and promote SMEs in the region while continuing to hold forums on the initiative.

2010

 Strategic focus Shifted to retail investments with new investments made in Al Raya, KSA and Etisalat Misr, Egypt
 Launched a new scheme, Arbah Investment Club, offering Islamic investment opportunities for its customers.

2011

Mawarid subsidiary

 Mawarid launched Mawarid Consultancy which provides banks, private companies and the government with Islamic Banking and Takaful outsourced services.

2012

 Adopted investment model of building synergies through acquisition and participation in related businesses
 Majority stake acquired in Falcon Eye Technology and TACME
 Strategic businesses built through launch of Mawarid Exchange and partnership with QuickNet

2013

 The strategic focus is on emerging as a conglomerate with complementary and supplementary business, while building synergies through shared services model
 On the financing side, Mawarid entered into pay card and WPS business lines

2014

 Mawarid obtained a MasterCard Principal License and launched Falak Tayyeb Credit Cards
 Entered healthcare through equity participation in Plus International Medical Center

2015

 The launch of the Mawarid Group:
  * 12 portfolio companies
  * Developed 22 Islamic banking products
  * Established Mawarid Technology – The largest technology company in the region

Social responsibility

 In 2007, Mawarid launched the Tamaiaz Award for new graduates and university seniors as part of its policy to drive Emiratisation and dedicated an annual budget of AED 1 million to it. It also encouraged other companies to join the initiative and by 2011, six national companies sponsored the award. Apart from the monetary rewards, recipients get job offers, benefits after they are employed and training to ensure their professional success. Rehab Lootah chairs the Tamaiaz Award executive committee. In 2008, Tanmia (the UAE National Human Resource Development & Employment Authority) signed an MoU with Mawarid to increase job opportunities for nationals, especially in Banking & Finance. Tanmia also promoted the Tamaiaz award.
As part of the Falak Tayyeb for SMEs campaign and in an effort to facilitate credit appraisals and improve credit assessments of prospective customers, Mawarid entered into MOUs with local audit firms, Talal Abu-Ghazaleh and Gulf Resources, to teach customers to maintain proper books of accounts and to audit the same at special concessional rates.
 Mawarid Finance was a strategic partner in the 8th Forum of the Gulf Disability Society, held from 18 to 20 March 2008 under the patronage of His Highness Dr. Sheikh Sultan bin Muhammad Al-Qasimi, Ruler of Sharjah.
 Mawarid Finance became a major sponsor of Dubai's Al Nasr Sports Club in 2008 to encourage more participation in sports by UAE nationals.

References

External links

 Mawarid Finance
 Tamaiaz Awards

Financial services companies of the United Arab Emirates
Islamic banks of the United Arab Emirates
Companies based in Dubai